Gareth Webb Payne (8 September 1935 – 2 July 2004) was an international rugby union player. He played club rugby for Pontypridd RFC and after joining the Royal Engineers he also represented the Army.

Notes

1935 births
2004 deaths
Barbarian F.C. players
Glamorgan County RFC players
London Welsh RFC players
People educated at Pontypridd High School
Pontypridd RFC players
Rugby union players from Merthyr Tydfil County Borough
Wales international rugby union players
Welsh rugby union players
Rugby union locks